Elections to Antrim Borough Council were held on 5 May 2011 on the same day as the other Northern Irish local government elections. The election used three district electoral areas to elect a total of 19 councillors.

Election results

Note: "Votes" are the first preference votes.

Districts summary

|- class="unsortable" align="centre"
!rowspan=2 align="left"|Ward
! % 
!Cllrs
! % 
!Cllrs
! %
!Cllrs
! %
!Cllrs
! % 
!Cllrs
! %
!Cllrs
!rowspan=2|TotalCllrs
|- class="unsortable" align="center"
!colspan=2 bgcolor="" | DUP
!colspan=2 bgcolor="" | UUP
!colspan=2 bgcolor="" | Sinn Féin
!colspan=2 bgcolor="" | SDLP
!colspan=2 bgcolor="" | Alliance
!colspan=2 bgcolor="white"| Others
|-
|align="left"|Antrim North West
|30.9
|1
|10.4
|1
|bgcolor="#008800"|29.0
|bgcolor="#008800"|2
|24.6
|1
|5.1
|0
|0.0
|0
|5
|-
|align="left"|Antrim South East
|bgcolor="#D46A4C"|28.7
|bgcolor="#D46A4C"|2
|21.7
|2
|12.5
|1
|11.6
|1
|17.5
|1
|8.0
|0
|7
|-
|align="left"|Antrim Town
|bgcolor="#D46A4C"|32.9
|bgcolor="#D46A4C"|2
|26.4
|2
|12.4
|1
|16.7
|1
|7.2
|1
|4.4
|0
|7
|-
|- class="unsortable" class="sortbottom" style="background:#C9C9C9"
|align="left"| Total
|30.6
|5
|19.9
|5
|17.2
|4
|16.5
|3
|11.3
|2
|4.5
|0
|19
|-
|}

Districts results

Antrim North West

2005: 2 x Sinn Féin, 1 x DUP, 1 x SDLP, 1 x UUP
2011: 2 x Sinn Féin, 1 x DUP, 1 x SDLP, 1 x UUP
2005-2011 Change: No change

Antrim South East

2005: 2 x DUP, 2 x UUP, 1 x SDLP, 1 x Sinn Féin, 1 x Alliance
2011: 2 x DUP, 2 x UUP, 1 x SDLP, 1 x Sinn Féin, 1 x Alliance
2005-2011 Change: No change

Antrim Town

2005: 3 x DUP, 2 x UUP, 1 x Alliance, 1 x SDLP
2011: 2 x DUP, 2 x UUP, 1 x Alliance, 1 x Sinn Féin, 1 x SDLP
2005-2011 Change: Sinn Féin gain from DUP

References

Antrim Borough Council elections
Antrim